Vladimir Mikhailovich Pilguy (born 26 January 1948) is a former Ukrainian and Soviet footballer.

Honours
 Soviet Top League runner-up: 1970.
 Soviet Top League bronze: 1973, 1975.
 Soviet Cup winner: 1970, 1977.
 UEFA Cup Winners' Cup finalist: 1972.
 UEFA Euro 1972 runner-up: 1972.
 Olympic bronze: 1972, 1980.
 Soviet Goalkeeper of the Year: 1973.
 Top 33 players year-end list: 1971, 1972, 1973, 1974, 1977.
 Soviet Footballer of the Year third place: 1973.
 Lev Yashin Club member.

International career
He earned 12 caps for the USSR national football team, and participated in UEFA Euro 1972, and won two Olympic bronze medals.

External links
Profile (in Russian)

1948 births
Footballers from Dnipro
Living people
Russian footballers
Soviet footballers
Soviet Union international footballers
Ukrainian footballers
UEFA Euro 1972 players
FC Dnipro players
FC Dynamo Moscow players
FC Kuban Krasnodar players
Soviet Top League players
Olympic footballers of the Soviet Union
Footballers at the 1972 Summer Olympics
Footballers at the 1980 Summer Olympics
Olympic bronze medalists for the Soviet Union
Olympic medalists in football
Medalists at the 1980 Summer Olympics
Medalists at the 1972 Summer Olympics
Association football goalkeepers